Orfelia nemoralis  is a Palearctic species of  'fungus gnats' in the family Keroplatidae. The larvae of Orfelia  are mycetophagous and live in decaying wood or other organic debris overgrown by fungal plant substrates.

References

Keroplatidae